Lombok International Airport, (Indonesian: Bandar Udara Internasional Lombok) , also known as Zainuddin Abdul Madjid International Airport, is an international airport on the island of Lombok in Indonesia.  It is the island's only fully operational airport.

It replaced Selaparang Airport, the island's previous sole operational airport, in Ampenan on the west coast of Lombok near the capital of Mataram.

The new facility was officially inaugurated by the president of Indonesia, Susilo Bambang Yudhoyono on 20 October 2011.  The airport can accommodate widebody high capacity Airbus A330 and Boeing 777 airliners, as well as smaller aircraft such as the Boeing 737 and Airbus A320 family which were already serving Lombok. The first arriving aircraft was a Garuda Indonesia Boeing 737-800NG marking the commencement of operations on 1 October 2011.

Naming

Bandara Internasional Lombok (BIL) had several operational names proposed. In January 2009 results of a public opinion poll conducted in Lombok indicated that Lombok International Airport (LIA) was chosen by 40.4% of respondents, Sasak International Airport (SIA) 20%, Rinjani International Airport (RIA) 46 16.7%, Mandalika the International Airport (MIA) 10.9%, Selaparang International Airport ( SIA) 8%, Pejanggik International Airport (PIA) 2.9%, and Arya Banjar Brittle International Airport (ABGIA) 1.1%.

According to the airport's official website, the name is Lombok International Airport in English, and Bandar Udara Internasional Lombok in Indonesian. It is referred to as Zainuddin Abdul Madjid International Airport in some sources. Muhammad Zainuddin Abdul Madjid was an ulema from Lombok which founded Nahdlatul Wathan, a prominent Islamic organization in the province.

The IATA code "LOP" only came into formal use in late November 2011. Before that the IATA code AMI, from Selaparang, was used by the airlines servicing the airport. Garuda and Batavia began to partially adopt the LOP code in their booking and ticketing systems at that time. Lion Air was using AMI at the end of November 2011; however, all flights were operating solely to and from Lombok International Airport.

Location

The airport site is at Tanak Awu, in Kabupaten Lombok Tengah (Regency of Central Lombok), Lombok, Indonesia, southwest of Mataram the provincial capital of Nusa Tenggara Barat and a few kilometers southwest of the small regional city of Praya.

The airport has a land area of about 551.8 hectares. Lombok International Airport has the second largest area after Soekarno–Hatta International Airport at the time of the opening of the airport.

Airlines and destinations

When the Lombok International Airport became operational, all the flight schedules at Lombok's Selaparang Airport were moved to the new facility.

As Selaparang Airport never accommodated widebody aircraft, it is expected that further international and domestic services will soon supplement the existing routes providing higher passenger loads and freight volumes to those of the airport at Ampenan.

Passenger

Public facilities and access

The airport is served by road links to the city of Mataram which is approximately 40 km to the northwest of the airport. It is approximately 55 km southeast of the established Senggigi tourism precinct of West Lombok. An integral component of the airport project was the building of a new link road to the city of Mataram to provide ready access to the city and tourism facilities on the west coast of the island. At the time of opening in late 2011 some sections of the new road remained incomplete. The developing area of Kuta and Selong Blanak lie 30 minutes to the south and provide some reasonably developed tourist facilities including hotels and restaurants.

The airport is not served by rail connections, and there are none available on the island.

The site is some distance from existing townships and external services; the nearest regional city is Praya, to the immediate north of the airport.

A tour desk, booking kiosks, and other facilities are available at the main terminal.

Car and bus parking

The airport has extensive paved parking areas at the main terminal and smaller facilities for the cargo terminal and administrative areas. Entrance is by a single controlled access point to the nearby highway.

Public bus services

Perum DAMRI provide a public airport shuttle service to Terminal Mandalika ('city bus terminal') on the eastern outskirts of Mataram and on to the west coast at Senggigi. The public bus service uses a dedicated fleet of modern air-conditioned buses and provides a scheduled service for set fees.

Taxi services

When the airport services were moved across from the previous facilities at Selaparang the Airport Taksi Koperasi moved operations to BIL. Upon the commencement of services from BIL they ceased to provide a set distance pre-paid docket system and adopted a metered ('argometer') method of charging for distance traveled. The airport taxi service is supplemented by metered taxis provided by the two established operators: Bluebird Taxi and Express Taxi.

Charter
Helicopter and fixed wing charter services are available by prior arrangement.

Development
The airport is undergoing a massive development project. After completion, the passenger capacity will be increased to 7.5 million, the runway will be expanded to 3,300 meters to allow wide bodied aircraft.

Phase I (2006–2009)
 Runway: 45 m x 2500 m
 Apron: 52,074 m2
 Taxiway: 2 exit taxiways
 Terminal: 12,000 m2 (passenger, VIP, cargo)
 Carpark: 17,500 m2

Phase II (2013–2015)
 Runway: 45m x 2750m
 Apron: 63,294 m2
 Taxiway: 2 exit taxiways
 Terminal: 16,500 m2 (2.4M passengers per year)
 Carpark: 29,100 m2

Phase III (2028)
 Runway: 45 m x 4,000 m
 Apron: 74,514 m2
 Taxiway: 12 exit taxiways, 2 rapid exit taxiways, 1 parallel taxiway
 Terminal: 28,750 m2 (3.25M passengers per year)
 Carpark: 29,100 m2

Statistics

Fire fighting and emergency services

 Category VIII – trained personnel, 30
 Foam tender – Type I
 Foam tender – Type II
 Crash car type 1 – 3 units
 Rescue tender –  I unit
 Rescue boat – 2 units
 Nurse tender – 1 unit
 Ambulance – 1 unit
 Utility car –  2 unit
 Tanker – 2 units
 Commando car – 1 unit

The airport has no capability for the removal of disabled aircraft.

Airport facilities and services

 Cargo handling facilities are provided by PT Gapura, PT. Jas, PT PTN, PT Kokapura
 Fuelling facilities – Avtur 50 / Jet A1 – 2 dispenser cap 550 KL, 3 tank refueller@12 KL 1 tank refueller @ 15 KL
 De-icing facilities – none
 Hangar space for visiting aircraft – none
 Repair facilities for visiting aircraft – none
 AD administration – Mon–Thu: 00.00 – 08.30, Fri: 23.00–07.30
 Custom and Immigration – Mon–Sun: 2300–1300
 Health and Sanitation – Mon–Sun: 2300–1300
 AIS Briefing Office – Mon–Sun: 2300–1300
 ATS Reporting Office – Mon–Sun: 2300–1300
 MET Briefing Office – Mon–Sun: 2300–1300
 ATS – Mon–Sun: 2300–1300
 Security – 24hrs

Information on flight procedures, communication procedures and airfield beacon and navigational aids were published by the Directorate General of Civil Aviation (Indonesia) in an AIRAC document published on 28 July 2011 with an effective date of 22 September 2011.

Aircraft types

B747, B767, A350, A340, A330, B777, C130, A320, B737-900, CRJ1000, F100, F28, F50, IL-96, SSJ-100, MA60, ATR 72, CN235, XL2.

Aircraft parking stands

 Stands Nr. 5 and 7 – available for B747, A330, B777, or below. Avio–Bridge available, with a RLG visual docking guidance system installed.
 Stands Nr. 1, 2, 3, 4, 6, 8, 9 and 10 – available for B737-900 or below
 Security line apron taxiway – 76.00 m (distance)

Flight schools

The airport is the base of local flight training academy "LIFT" (Lombok Institute of Flight Technology) operating 3 Liberty XL2 training aircraft 6 days per week.

References

External links 

 PT. Angkasa Pura 1 (PERSERO)
 
 Kabupaten Lombok Tengah, the Regency of Central Lombok
 Directorate General of Civil Aviation Republic of Indonesia

Airports established in 2011
2011 establishments in Indonesia
Airports in West Nusa Tenggara
Lombok
Buildings and structures in West Nusa Tenggara
Transport in West Nusa Tenggara